Kasegar Kola (also Romanized as Kāsegar Kolā; also known as Kāsehgar Kalā and Kāsehgar Kolā) is a village in Nowkand Kola Rural District, in the Central District of Qaem Shahr County, Mazandaran Province, Iran. At the 2006 census, its population was 564, in 162 families.

References 

Populated places in Qaem Shahr County